Tomás Carbonell and Francisco Roig were the defending champions, but did not participate this year.

Horacio de la Peña and Francisco Roig won in the final 3–6, 6–1, 6–2, against Royce Deppe and John Sullivan.

Seeds

  Diego Nargiso /  Javier Sánchez (quarterfinals)
  Mark Koevermans /  Kent Kinnear (semifinals)
  Horacio de la Peña /  Jorge Lozano (champions)
  Mike Bauer /  David Rikl (quarterfinals)

Draw

Draw

References
Draw

ATP Athens Open
1993 ATP Tour